Takapuna is a suburb located on the North Shore of Auckland, New Zealand. The suburb is situated at the beginning of a south-east-facing peninsula forming the northern side of the Waitematā Harbour. While very small in terms of population, it was the seat of the North Shore City Council before amalgamation into Auckland Council in 2010 and contains substantial shopping and entertainment areas, acting as a CBD for the North Shore.

History 

The Māori place name Takapuna originally referred to a freshwater spring that flowed from the base of North Head into a swamp behind Cheltenham Beach. In 1841 the wife of Eruera Maihi Patuone sold 9500 acres of Auckland's North Shore to the Crown. Referred to as Takapuna Parish, the North Shore was surveyed and subdivided in 1844. In 1851 Governor Grey gifted back to Patuone 110 acres between the inlet beside Barry's Point Road and Takapuna Beach to use until his death (1872). This area included a Māori settlement known as Waiwharariki, on the small Shoal Bay headland now crossed by Esmonde Road.

The earliest subdivisions of farmland for suburban development were the "Hurstmere" estate in 1886 and the "Pupuke" Estate in 1889. The Takapuna and Milford Beach areas, as well as the land surrounding Lake Pupuke soon became popular spots for wealthy businessmen building summer homes to entertain in a rural surrounding, and eventually, many moved here permanently, commuting to work in Auckland via ferry.

In 1962, Takapuna became the location where the COMPAC submarine communications cable connected Auckland to Suva, Fiji, and onwards to Vancouver, Canada. The system was in use until 7 December 1984.

A local history archive is maintained by the New Zealand Collection of Takapuna Public Library. It includes an index of the local newspapers, archives, photographs, oral histories, and historical material relating to Takapuna.

Geography

Takapuna is located on the isthmus of a peninsula which extends south into the northern waters of the Waitemata at the harbour's eastern end. As such, the suburb has a coastline on Shoal Bay, an arm of the Waitemata to the southwest, as well as having a coast on the Hauraki Gulf to the northeast. The northern end of the suburb is dominated by the large volcanic crater of Lake Pupuke. Some points in Takapuna are less than 500 metres from all three of these bodies of water. The Hauraki coastline includes a kilometre long crescent shaped beach (Takapuna Beach) which is a popular recreation area.

To the southeast of Takapuna lies the six-kilometre-long peninsula which contains the suburbs of Belmont and Devonport. To the west lie the suburbs of Hillcrest and Northcote. The suburb of Milford lies to the north, on the far shore of Lake Pupuke.

Demographics

Takapuna had a population of 8,343 at the 2018 New Zealand census, an increase of 594 people (7.7%) since the 2013 census, and an increase of 1,479 people (21.5%) since the 2006 census. There were 3,558 households, comprising 3,933 males and 4,410 females, giving a sex ratio of 0.89 males per female, with 1,086 people (13.0%) aged under 15 years, 1,524 (18.3%) aged 15 to 29, 3,696 (44.3%) aged 30 to 64, and 2,037 (24.4%) aged 65 or older.

Ethnicities were 72.5% European/Pākehā, 4.4% Māori, 1.8% Pacific peoples, 23.2% Asian, and 4.6% other ethnicities. People may identify with more than one ethnicity.

The percentage of people born overseas was 42.7, compared with 27.1% nationally.

Although some people chose not to answer the census's question about religious affiliation, 47.5% had no religion, 41.5% were Christian, 0.1% had Māori religious beliefs, 1.3% were Hindu, 1.2% were Muslim, 1.3% were Buddhist and 2.0% had other religions.

Of those at least 15 years old, 2,862 (39.4%) people had a bachelor's or higher degree, and 600 (8.3%) people had no formal qualifications. 2,172 people (29.9%) earned over $70,000 compared to 17.2% nationally. The employment status of those at least 15 was that 3,297 (45.4%) people were employed full-time, 1,011 (13.9%) were part-time, and 204 (2.8%) were unemployed.

Local government 

From 1876 until 1913, Takapuna was a part of the Takapuna Riding administered by the Waitemata County, a large rural county north and west of the city of Auckland. In 1913, the area split from the county, forming the Takapuna Borough Council, which became the Takapuna City Council in 1961. In 1989, the borough was merged into the North Shore City. North Shore City Council was amalgamated into Auckland Council in November 2010.

Within the Auckland Council, Takapuna is a part of the Devonport-Takapuna local government area governed by the Devonport-Takapuna Local Board. It is a part of the North Shore ward, which elects two councillors to the Auckland Council.

List of mayors
Between 1913 and 1989, Takapuna had 11 mayors. The following is a complete list:

Economy

Retail

The Takapuna Beach area is a nightlife hub and boutique shopping centre of the North Shore, having many bars, restaurants, cafes and shops.

Shore City Shopping Centre opened in Takapuna in 1974. It covers 14,900 m2, and has 826 carparks and 63 shops, including Farmers, New World Metro and Les Mills.

The area has potential in its central business area and wider precincts to further develop into the southern hub of the North Shore.

Commercial 

Takapuna is home to commercial businesses including web design company Byte Media, event managers Adrenaline Group, the headquarters of Provident Insurance and the global headquarters of SaaS software firm Unleashed Software.

Sport

Takapuna is home to Takapuna AFC who compete in the Lotto Sport Italia NRFL Division 1A. Since 1974 Takapuna Rugby Football Club has been located at Onewa Domain, which is in the neighbouring suburb of Northcote. Prior to that the club were located at Taharoto Park which is located on Taharoto Rd in Takapuna.

Education
They are state integrated Catholic schools located adjacent to each other. Rosmini College was founded in 1962, and St Joseph's in 1894.

It was established in 1970.
It celebrated its 125th jubilee in 2004.

Rolls are as of 

Takapuna Grammar School is in Belmont, to the southeast of Takapuna. It is the main public secondary school in the area.

Notable residents

 Claire Ahuriri-Dunning – playwright
 Lisa Chappell – actress and singer
 Lorde – singer-songwriter
 Deborah Pullen – footballer
 Winston Reid – footballer 
 Pamela Stephenson – TV personality, psychologist, comedian

In popular culture
The TVNZ comedy-drama Go Girls was set in Takapuna.

The Block NZ'''s first season took place in Takapuna.

Shania Twain's 2003 music video for When You Kiss Me'' was shot in Takapuna.

References

External links

 Takapuna Beach (website of the local business association)
 Photographs of Takapuna held in Auckland Libraries' heritage collections.

Suburbs of Auckland
North Shore, New Zealand
Populated places around the Waitematā Harbour
Populated places around the Hauraki Gulf / Tīkapa Moana
Populated lakeshore places in New Zealand